122–124 Colmore Row is a Grade I listed building on Colmore Row in Birmingham, England. Built as the Eagle Insurance Offices it was later occupied by Orion Insurance and was Hudson's Coffee House until late 2011, It is currently Java Lounge Coffee House.

Completed in 1900, it was designed in an Arts and Crafts style by William Lethaby and Joseph Lancaster Ball. Pevsner's The Buildings of England: Warwickshire describes it as "one of the most original buildings of its date in England" and Foster's Birmingham (Pevsner Architectural Guides) as "one of the most important monuments of the Arts and Crafts Free Style in the country".

Evenacre acquired the building in 2011 and undertook a £500,000 renovation of the building including restoration of the stone façade and interior works including a feature reception. In October 2014 CBRE started marketing the vacant building to potential tenants.

References

External links

 
 Location, OpenStreetMap

Office buildings completed in 1900
Grade I listed office buildings
Birmingham, Colmore
Grade I listed buildings in Birmingham